Senate elections were held in the Czech Republic for the first time on 15 and 16 November 1996, with a second round on 22 and 23 November. the first after independence. The result was a victory for the Civic Democratic Party, which won 32 of the 81 seats. Voter turnout was 34.9% in the first round and 30.6% in the second.

This was the only time Senate elections were held in all 81 single-member constituencies at the same time. Senators elected in 1996 were divided into three classes depending on number of their constituencies to determine which Senate seats would be up for election in 1998, 2000 and 2002. Senators in the Czech Republic are elected for six-year terms, with one-third being renewed every two years.

The elections were held using the two-round system, with an absolute majority required to be elected.

Opinion polls

Results

References

Czech Republic
Senate
Senate
Senate elections in the Czech Republic
Czech